Mock Spanish is a loaded term used to describe a variety of Spanish-inspired phrases used by speakers of English. Spanish-inspired phrases are generally used in a humorous way, but at least one person has asserted that it could lead to unfavorable or stereotypical views of Spanish speakers. The term "mock Spanish" has been popularized by anthropologist-linguist Jane H. Hill of the University of Arizona, most recognizably in relation to the catchphrase, "Hasta la vista, baby", from the film, Terminator 2: Judgment Day. Hill argues using pseudo-Spanish terms like "hasty banana" (for hasta mañana), "buenos nachos" (for buenas noches), "el cheapo", "no problemo", "hasta la bye-bye", and other words is covert racism. It is also seen as a manifestation of linguistic racism.

Background 
English speakers in the United States of America have had a long history of connection with the Spanish language; the first connections came from Spain, but later Mexico and other Latin American countries became the primary source of interactions with the Spanish language.

The Immigration Act of 1924 established a quota of immigrants from various nationalities that could come to the United States. While this broadened the number of immigrants, there was still an anti-immigrant sentiment with this law. However with this law, Spanish started to be included in public documents and forms like voting guides, ballots, and public announcements, but Spanish as a first language was still against the rules in public schools and was discouraged in the public sphere. The law was again changed in 1952, but was significantly altered with the Immigration and Nationality Act of 1965. This abolished the nationality quotas.

The high degree of contact between Spanish and English in the United States inevitably led to loanwords, calques, code switching and other manifestations of interactions between language that are common throughout the world. Some of these manifestations came to be called "Mock Spanish" by researchers.

Research 
With the use of Mock Spanish gaining popularity, anthropologists began researching the questions of who used Mock Spanish and if it was considered racist discourse. Hill found that mock Spanish was especially prevalent "among middle- and upper-income, college-educated whites". She claimed that many of those who make use of mock Spanish or mock language in their casual speech consider it harmless or even flattering. She asserted, with no proof, that native Spanish speakers are likely to find it insulting. Laura Callahan, a published Ph.D. graduate in Hispanic linguistics, further examined the mock Spanish discourse through media and as a possible marker of racism. Callahan's study of Mock Spanish, in relation to Hill's study, agrees that there is a distinction between what the people who use Mock Spanish see the use as, and what the people that are often the target of Mock Spanish think of its use. This distinction is between "Good fun" and "Making fun," one term being used by the users of Mock Spanish (Anglo-Americans), the other used by those who may feel or be considered the "targets" of this discourse (native Spanish speakers).

White spaces and institutionalized racism 
The discussion about the interconnection between racism and Mock Spanish is also a discussion that includes existing societal structures that would allow for racism to survive. In José, can you see?, Ana Celia Zentella, a researcher in "anthro-political linguistics", describes mock Spanish as one half of a double standard in which Hispanics are expected to conform to the linguistic norms of English while Anglo-Americans are free to ignore all grammatical aspects of the Spanish language they are borrowing from.

In "Their Language, Our Spanish," author Adam Schwartz, whose education specialty is in Spanish language education in the U.S, discusses the spaces that allow the supposed double standard that Mock Spanish is a part of. He argued that the use of Mock Spanish by middle and upper class whites create a "white public space". These "white public spaces", he alleges, allow the continuous production of racism along with societally established privilege and social order. In the article Schwartz states, "...[the] unspoken and institutionalized White normalcy underlying [Mock Spanish] carries over to spaces where language is learned, spoken and (re) claimed." Both Hill and Schwartz argue that Mock Spanish is packed with discreet racism; however, Schwartz furthers that argument by stating that it can encode for societal power positions and institutionalized disadvantages.

The opposing perspective 
In the discourse around Mock Spanish and its connection to racism, Rusty Barrett's research on the use of Mock Spanish in a Mexican restaurant is heavily cited. While Barrett acknowledges and discusses the racial and unfavorable stigmatization that Mock Spanish may have on native Spanish speakers, the study also focuses on how language ideologies influence the interactions of Anglo-American managers and Spanish-speaking workers in a Mexican restaurant. In this examination, Barrett mentions the idea that Anglo-Americans' lack of attention and indifference to the Spanish language, in that particular scenario and in certain ways, might not be a bad thing. 

Rusty Barrett's study states that while Mock Spanish can be seen as restrictive on a monolingual Spanish speaker's agency and at times racist, it may shift a Spanish speaker's ability to establish their agency in other ways, at least in the setting of this Mexican restaurant. It explains that because the Anglo-Americans ignore the grammatical components of Spanish and use it in a joking and unfavorable manner, it allows the Spanish-speaking workers to openly and loudly speak their opinions and even themselves mock the Anglo-managers. Examples in his article show that despite the restrictive-ness that is seen as a part of the Mock-Spanish culture, the Spanish speakers were able to use their agency, through things like access to better food during work because of the kinds of jobs they held and how little attention Anglo-managers paid to them. 

Additionally, because of the more custodial and low-interaction job positions they held, monolingual Spanish workers at this restaurant were able to assert agency through knowledge of hidden garbage bags that monolingual English speaking bartenders would need because they were often told they could leave as soon as the garbage had been taken out. The access afforded by speaking Spanish was valuable because busers would sometimes insist that bartenders give beer to all the kitchen workers in exchange for a few garbage bags. A bartender in search of bags once told Barret, “The bags are in the escondidas, wherever that is.”. These examples display the shift in the monolingual Spanish workers agency, despite the Mock Spanish culture in which they are surrounded by through their Anglo-managers.

Mock Spanish vs. other forms of "Anglo-Spanish" 
Hill contrasts mock Spanish with two other registers of "Anglo Spanish" that she refers to as "Nouvelle Spanish" (largely used to provide a Spanish flavor for marketing purposes, e.g. "the land of mañana" used to describe the Southwest or "Hair Casa" as the name of a beauty salon) and "Cowboy Spanish" (loanwords for region-specific objects and concepts, such as coyote, mesa, and tamale).

See also

 Spanglish

References

Further reading
 
 
 
 
Duranti, Alessandro. Linguistic Anthropology : a Reader 2nd ed. Malden, MA: Wiley-Blackwell, 2009. 

Macaronic language
Spanish language in the United States
American English